Jameln is a municipality in the district Lüchow-Dannenberg, in Lower Saxony, Germany. Jameln is part of the Samtgemeinde ("collective municipality") Elbtalaue.

The main village in the municipality is Jameln, with around 450 inhabitants.

Settlements

 Breese im Bruche
 Breselenz
 Breustian
 Jameln
 Langenhorst
 Mehlfien
 Platenlaase
 Teichlosen
 Volkfien
 Wibbese
Additionally, there are three hamlets:
 Hoheluft
 Jamelner Mühle
 Krammühle

Before 1972, Hoheluft belonged to Volkfien, Jamelner Mühle to Jameln and Krammühle to Breselenz.

Notable people
Mathematician Bernhard Riemann (1826–1866) was born in Breselenz.

References

Lüchow-Dannenberg